Karuiyeh (also Romanized as Karū‘īyeh; also known as Kerūyeh and Kīrū) is a village in Ruydar Rural District, Ruydar District, Khamir County, Hormozgan Province, Iran. At the 2006 census, its population was 1,167, in 318 families.

References 

Populated places in Khamir County